The Zig-Zag Girl illusion is a stage illusion akin to the more famous sawing a woman in half illusion. In the Zig-Zag illusion, a magician divides an assistant into thirds, only to have them emerge from the illusion at the end of the performance completely unharmed.

Since its invention in 1965 by magician Robert Harbin, it has been hailed as one of the greatest illusions ever invented due to both the apparent impossibility of the trick and the fact that, unlike many illusions, it can be performed while surrounded by spectators and withstand the scrutiny of audience members.

Harbin was frustrated by his illusions being pirated by other magicians, and this inspired him to publish the method in his book The Magic of Robert Harbin (1970). The book was limited to 500 copies, and owners of the book were granted permission to build or have built the Zig Zag Girl (or indeed any other of the items in the book). The rights to the book and the Zig Zag illusion were then in time passed to The Magic Circle in the wake of Harbin's death.  The concept of dividing a lady assistant into two or three parts was something that Harbin experimented with throughout his career before creating his ultimate divide, the Zig Zag Girl.  Evidence of his fascination with this concept of dividing an assistant can be found in his earlier publications; the closest relative to the Zig Zag is the "Little by Little" illusion, which was also explained in The Magic of Robert Harbin.

Harbin's original Zig Zag Girl illusion is currently on display in The Magic Triangle museum.

The effect 
The assistant (usually a woman) is placed in an upright cabinet, her face, hands, and left foot visible through openings in the front of the cabinet. Large metal blades are inserted horizontally in the cabinet's midsection, dividing it—and presumably the assistant inside—into thirds. The magician then slides the cabinet's midsection apart from the top and bottom thirds, giving the appearance that the assistant's midsection has been pulled away from the rest of her, giving her a "zig-zag" shape. While divided, a small door on the cabinet's midsection can be opened to examine—even touch—the assistant's body inside, a duty frequently performed by an audience member brought up on stage to help perform the illusion. At the completion of the illusion, the assistant's midsection is slid back into place, the two blades removed, and she steps out of the cabinet unscathed.

Further developments
A number of magicians have begun performing variations on the basic illusion. In some, rather than the assistant's face being visible through a hole in the front of the cabinet, their entire head projects out of the cabinet through a hole in its upper surface. In another variation, rather than being divided into three pieces, the assistant is instead divided into five - This variation is commonly referred to as the "Five-Way Zig-Zag".

Method

The method of this trick was partially  explained by Masked Magician Val Valentino as part of a Fox TV series called Breaking the Magicians' Code: Magic's Biggest Secrets Finally Revealed. The trick hinges on two things: that people will not suspect the woman is key for the trick to work, and that the box is larger than it appears. Details are as follows:
 Unlike more conventional magic tricks, this illusion relies on the skill of the woman inside, while the magician outside is a demonstrator. The success of the illusion rests on the woman's ability to fit into the smallest possible space.
 The black strips down the sides make the box appear narrow. In reality, all that black space is usable. The box accommodates the woman (although it is a very tight fit).
 The blades are inserted into the right side of the box. It appears as if the blades take up more space; when inserted, the handle fills up the width of the box on the outside: but the blade inside only slices a portion of the box.
 The sliding contraption is not as narrow as it seems. Black paint hides a column that gives extra space for the woman. The designer of the box must give the most space to the woman while making it appear as small as possible.

Cultural references
Films
In the comedy film A Pleasure Doing Business (1979), actress Misty Rowe is shown inside of a trisected Zig Zag Girl box, although the trick itself is not depicted.

Literature
In Elly Griffiths' mystery novel The Zig Zag Girl (2014), detective Edgar Stephens enlists the help of his former military buddy, master magician and former Magic Circle member Max Mephisto, to solve the murder of a young woman whose body was cut in thirds like a Zig Zag Girl's, the body parts placed in boxes akin to magicians' Zig Zag Girl prop boxes.
 The title character in Steve Martin's play The Zig-Zag Woman spends the majority of the play in a Zig Zag Girl box.

Television
 In the TV series Monk (Season 7, Episode 15: "Mr Monk and the Magician"), a Zig Zag cabinet is used with Adrian Monk inside the cabinet.
 In the episode "Our Very First Telethon" of Full House, Joey performs this trick with Rebecca standing in as his assistant.  The box gets stuck as Joey tries to put Rebecca back together and she must perform her song with Danny while still in the box.
 In season 4, episode 10 of the animated sitcom Bob's Burgers, Tina is left in the Zig Zag box after she volunteers for the role of assistant with her uninterested crush.
 In Season 5, episode 4 of Inside No 9, the lead character's wife is seen inside a Zig Zag Lady, rehearsing for a show.

See also
 Clearly Impossible, variant on the trick
 Hemicorporectomy, when a person is actually cut in half

Further reading

References

External links
Video, The Masked Magician reveals the Zig-Zag Girl.
 History of Magic on the Zig Zag Girl

Magic tricks